Gongnong Subdistrict is a subdistrict in Jingyang District, Deyang, Sichuan province, China. , it has 19 residential communities and 2 villages under its administration.

See also 
 List of township-level divisions of Sichuan

References 

Township-level divisions of Sichuan
Deyang